Tiia is an Estonian and Finnish feminine given name.

As of 1 January 2021, 2,201 women in Estonia have the first name Tiia, making it the 72nd most popular female name in the country. The name is most commonly found in Põlva  County. Individuals bearing the name Tiia include:

Tiia Eeskivi (born 1969), Estonian hurdler
Tiia Hautala (born 1972), Finnish heptathlete
Tiia Kõnnussaar (born 1965), Estonian writer, editor and journalist
Tiia-Ester Loitme (born 1933), Estonian conductor
Tiia Peltonen (born 1995), Finnish footballer
Tiia Piili (born 1979), Finnish gymnast 
Tiia Reima (born 1973), Finnish ice hockey player
Tiia-Maria Talvitie (born 1994), Finnish biathlete
Tiia Teder (born 1959), Estonian musicologist, music journalist and editor
Tiia Toomet (born 1947), Estonian writer and poet

References

Feminine given names
Estonian feminine given names
Finnish feminine given names